Nobiletin is a flavonoid isolated from citrus peels. It is an O-methylated flavone that has the activity to rescue bulbectomy-induced memory impairment.

Potential pharmacology
Nobiletin was found to potentially inhibit cartilage degradation.

Nobiletin was shown to augment AMPA receptor activity and long-term potentiation in cell culture. Synergistic chemopreventive effects of nobiletin and atorvastatin on colon carcinogenesis have been described.

References

External links 
 Nobiletin, phytochemicals.info

O-methylated flavones
Flavonoids found in Rutaceae